And Then There Were None is a 2015 mystery thriller television serial that was first broadcast on BBC One from 26 to 28 December 2015. The three-part programme was adapted by Sarah Phelps and directed by Craig Viveiros and is based on Agatha Christie's 1939 novel of the same name. The series features an ensemble cast, including Douglas Booth, Charles Dance, Maeve Dermody, Burn Gorman, Anna Maxwell Martin, Sam Neill, Miranda Richardson, Toby Stephens, Noah Taylor, and Aidan Turner. The programme follows a group of strangers who are invited to an isolated island where they are murdered one by one for their past crimes.

The serial, debuting to 6 million viewers, received critical acclaim with many praising the writing, performances, and cinematography. It also scored high ratings.

Synopsis
On a hot day in late August 1939, ten people, all strangers to each other, are invited to a small, isolated island off the coast of Devon, England, called Soldier's Island, by a "Mr. and Mrs. Owen". The guests settle in at the manor home on the island tended by two newly hired servants, a husband and wife, Mr. Thomas Rogers and Mrs. Ethel Rogers, but their hosts are absent. When the guests sit down to dinner, they notice the centrepiece, ten abstract art deco figurines, supposedly representing ten soldiers arranged in a circle. Afterward, Mr. Rogers puts on a gramophone record, from which a voice accuses everyone present of a murder. Shortly after this, one of the party dies from poisoning, and then more and more people are murdered, all in methods synonymous with a poem affixed in each bedroom. With each death, the murderer removes a figurine from the centerpiece to coincide with the rhyme's sinister disappearance of each "little soldier boy." The remaining people must discover who the murderer is before they run out of time and nobody remains.

Cast

Main

 Douglas Booth as Anthony James Marston
 Charles Dance as Justice Lawrence John Wargrave
 Maeve Dermody as Vera Elizabeth Claythorne
 Burn Gorman as Detective Sergeant William Henry Blore
 Anna Maxwell Martin as Ethel Rogers
 Sam Neill as General John Gordon Macarthur
 Miranda Richardson as Emily Caroline Brent
 Toby Stephens as Doctor Edward George Armstrong
 Noah Taylor as Thomas Rogers
 Aidan Turner as Philip Lombard

Featured in flashbacks

 Harley Gallacher as Cyril Ogilvie Hamilton
 Paul Chahidi as Isaac Morris
 Charlie Russell as Audrey
 Richard Hansell as Recording Artist
 Christopher Hatherall as Fred Narracott
 Ben Deery as Henry Richmond
 Margot Edwards as Miss Brady
 Rob Heaps as Hugo Hamilton 
 Celia Henebury as Leslie Macarthur
 Tom Clegg as Landor
 Daisy Waterstone as Beatrice
 Catherine Bailey as Olivia Ogilvie Hamilton
 Joseph Prowen as Edward Seton

Production

Conception

And Then There Were None was commissioned by Ben Stephenson and Charlotte Moore for the BBC to mark the 125th anniversary of Agatha Christie's birth. The adaptation was produced by Mammoth Screen in partnership with Agatha Christie Productions.

Writer Sarah Phelps told the BBC that she was shocked by the starkness and brutality of the novel. Comparing the novel to Christie's other work, she stated, "Within the Marple and Poirot stories somebody is there to unravel the mystery, and that gives you a sense of safety and security, of predicting what is going to happen next... In this book that doesn't happen – no one is going to come to save you, absolutely nobody is coming to help or rescue or interpret."

Casting
Maeve Dermody was cast two days before the read through of the script and was in Myanmar at the time. She flew to the UK to begin work with a dialect coach and read the book in the first two weeks of filming.

Filming
Filming began in July 2015. Cornwall was used for many of the harbour and beach scenes, including Holywell Bay, Kynance Cove, and Mullion Cove. Harefield House in Hillingdon, outside London, served as the location for the island mansion. Production designer Sophie Beccher decorated the house in the style of 1930s designers like Syrie Maugham and Elsie de Wolfe. The below stairs and kitchen scenes were shot at Wrotham Park in Hertfordshire. Railway scenes were filmed at the South Devon Railway between Totnes and Buckfastleigh.

Episodes

Reception
And Then There Were None received critical acclaim and was a ratings success for the BBC, with the first episode netting over 6 million viewers and becoming the second most watched programme on Boxing Day. Each of the two subsequent episodes netted over 5 million viewers.

On review aggregator Rotten Tomatoes, And Then There Were None has an approval rating of 86% based on 13 reviews, with an average rating of 7.5/10. The site's critics' consensus reads: "Dark yet dashingly executed, And Then There Were None offers a brazenly misanthropic look at human nature."

Ben Dowell of the Radio Times gave a positive review. Jasper Reese for The Daily Telegraph gave the first episode 4 out of 5 stars, calling it a "pitch-black psychological thriller as teasing murder mystery" and "spiffingly watchable".

Reviewing the first episode, UK daily newspaper The Guardians Sam Wollaston noted, "[...] it also manages to be loyal, not just in plot but in spirit as well. I think the queen of crime would approve. I certainly do. Mass murder rarely gets as fun as this." Reviewing the final episode for The Daily Telegraph, Tim Martin gave it 4 out of 5 stars, calling it a "class act", and praising the adaptation for highlighting the darkness of Christie's novel, which he claimed no previous adaptation had attempted. The Russian adaption, ‘’Desyat Negrityat’’ from 1987, however, was the first visual adaption to include the novel’s original ending.

Subsequent series
And Then There Were None was the first in a series of Christie adaptations scripted by Sarah Phelps for the BBC. The further instalments consisted of: The Witness for the Prosecution (2016), Ordeal by Innocence (2018), The ABC Murders (2018) and The Pale Horse (2020).

See also
 And Then There Were None (disambiguation)

Notes

References

External links
 
 

2010s British television miniseries
2015 British television series debuts
2015 British television series endings
2010s British drama television series
Films shot in England
2010s crime thriller films
British crime films
British mystery films
English-language television shows
Television series set in the 1930s
Television shows based on works by Agatha Christie
BBC television dramas
Television series by Mammoth Screen
Films based on And Then There Were None